Jeffrey Welborn is a Republican member of the Montana Senate.  He was elected to House District 72 which represents the Dillon area and now serves as a State Senator of District 36. In 2022, he supported the state of Montana's proposed purchase of a 5,600-acre ranch from Shodair Children's Hospital in order to open up 100,000 acres of public land for easier access by the public.

External links 
 Ballotpedia
 Montana Senate - Rep. Jeffrey Welborn
 Biography from Project Vote Smart
 Legislative profile from Project Vote Smart

References

Living people
Year of birth missing (living people)
Republican Party members of the Montana House of Representatives
21st-century American politicians